Korizagheh (also Romanized as Korīzāgheh; also known as Kor Zāgheh, Kūh-e Zakheh, Kūh-i-Zākha, and Kūh Zākheh) is a village in Kanduleh Rural District, Dinavar District, Sahneh County, Kermanshah Province, Iran. At the 2006 census, its population was 289, in 53 families.

References 

Populated places in Sahneh County